Anatol Lieven is a British author, journalist, and policy analyst best known for his expertise on the Taliban of Afghanistan. He is currently a visiting professor at King's College London and senior fellow at the Quincy Institute for Responsible Statecraft.

Background

Peter Paul Anatol Lieven was born on 28 June 1960 in London to Alexander and Veronica Eileen Mary Lieven (née Monahan). He is the brother of Elena, Dominic, Michael, and Dame Nathalie Lieven.  He received a BA in history and a PhD in political science from Jesus College, Cambridge.

Career

Journalist

In the mid-1980s, Lieven was a journalist with the Financial Times covering Pakistan and Afghanistan, while also covering India as a freelancer. In the latter half of 1989, he covered the revolutions in Czechoslovakia and Romania for the Times. In 1990, he worked for The Times (London) covering the former USSR, during which time he covered the Chechen War (1994–1996). In 1996, Lieven became a visiting senior fellow at the U.S. Institute of Peace through 1997. In 1998, he edited Strategic Comments at the International Institute for Strategic Studies in London, while also working for the Eastern Services of the BBC.

Academic

Lieven's areas of expertise and interest include:  Insurgency and Counter-Insurgency:  Terrorism, Islamist movements, Pakistan, Afghanistan, Russia and the former Soviet Union, US political culture and strategy. He has spoken as an expert to the British Parliament and the British Foreign and Commonwealth Office, United States Congress and United States Department of State, and the French Foreign Ministry, as well as universities and institutes. In 2000 through 2005, Lieven was a senior associate for foreign and security policy at the Carnegie Endowment for International Peace. Lieven served as chair of International Relations and Terrorism Studies at King's College London, where he remains a visiting professor. In 2006, Lieven became a professor at Georgetown University's School of Foreign Service at its campus in Qatar. Since 2005, Lieven has been a senior researcher (Bernard L. Schwartz fellow and American Strategy Program fellow) at the New America Foundation, where he focuses on US global strategy and the War on Terrorism.

Awards
 1994: Orwell Prize for a political book,  for The Baltic Revolution
 1993:  Notable Book of the Year by The New York Times Book Review
 1993:  Yale University Press Governors' Award for The Baltic Revolution

Bibliography

Books
 Climate Change and the Nation State (2020)
 Pakistan: A Hard Country (2011); as a Penguin pocketbook (2012)
 Ethical Realism: A Vision for America’s Role in the World (2006) with John Hulsman
 America Right or Wrong: An Anatomy of American Nationalism (2004) (2012)
 Ukraine and Russia: Fraternal Rivals (1999)
 Chechnya: Tombstone of Russian Power (1998)
 The Baltic Revolution: Estonia, Latvia, Lithuania and the Path to Independence (1993)

Chapters, briefs
 "Realism and Progress: Niebuhr's Thought and Contemporary Challenges," in Reinhold Niebuhr and Contemporary Politics: God and Power (2010)
 "The future of US foreign policy," US Foreign Policy (2008)
 "A Spreading Danger: Time for a New Policy Toward Chechnya", Carnegie Policy Brief #35, (2005)
 "Ambivalent Neighbors: The EU, NATO and the Price of Membership" with Dmitri Trenin (2003)
 "Ukraine and Russia: A Fraternal Rivalry" (1999)

Critical studies and reviews of Lieven's work
Climate Change and the Nation State

References

External links

1960 births
Living people
Academics of King's College London
Alumni of Jesus College, Cambridge
British male journalists
British non-fiction writers
Historians of Pakistan
British people of Russian descent
Lieven family
Political realists